The Kennesaw State Owls college football team represents Kennesaw State University in the Big South Conference. The Owls currently compete as a member of the National Collegiate Athletic Association (NCAA) Division I Football Championship Subdivision. The program has had 1 head coach since it began play during the 2015 season.

Kennesaw State has played 22 games over 2 seasons, appearing in 0 bowl games.

Key

Coaches

Notes

References

Kennesaw State

Kennesaw State Owls football coaches